Xylotheca kraussiana is an African shrub or small multi-stemmed tree growing in the sandveld and widely distributed throughout the eastern parts of Southern Africa, in particular the eastern Transvaal, coastal Natal and Mozambique, preferring the sandy soils of coastal bush and forest.

'Xylotheca' meaning 'woody case' and the species name honouring Dr C.F.F. Krauss (1812-1890), a German naturalist, who later became director of Stuttgart's Natural History Museum. Krauss came to the Cape in 1838, collected in Natal from 1839 to 1840. About 8 other species of Xylotheca are to be found in central Africa and Madagascar.

Leaves are dull grey-green, alternate and covered in soft grey hairs. Flowers are white with a dense central cluster of yellow anthers and resembling a small white rose. Yellow when ripe, it partly splits into 5 sections revealing black seeds with a bright red aril. The pulp around the seeds is relished by birds.

This plant used to belong to the family Flacourtiaceae, but was relocated to Achariaceae by the Angiosperm Phylogeny Group.

See also
List of Southern African indigenous trees

Achariaceae
Trees of South Africa
Flora of Mozambique